The Crowd (subtitled For Elias Canetti) is an album by the Rova Saxophone Quartet recorded in France in 1985 for the Swiss Hathut label.

Reception 

The Allmusic review by Thom Jurek states "The Crowd is seamless in both composition and execution after the first few minutes that is "Sport," and directly into the nearly 20-minute title work it becomes impossible for the listener to know what was written and what was improvised. Certainly each member of this group solos, but it is the simultaneous improvisation and the harmonic texture of the composition itself that winds and weaves its way not only though different musical territory (there is even a section that nods toward Adams and Philip Glass), but diverse emotional ground is covered as well. To call this music "jazz" would be both accurate and a mistake, for it is both entirely jazz and not at all; to call it "free music" or "new music" would be just plain lazy and stupid; to call this ROVA music would make sense".

Track listing 
 "Sport" (Bruce Ackley, Phil Ochs, Jon Raskin, Andrew Voigt) – 3:05
 "The Crowd" (Ackley, Ochs, Raskin, Voigt) – 19:12
 "Room" (Ochs) – 10:40
 "Knife in the Times 1-8" (Ochs) – 29:25
 "Terrains" (Raskin) – 16:19

Personnel 
Bruce Ackley – soprano saxophone
Andrew Voigt – alto saxophone, clarinet
Larry Ochs – tenor saxophone, soprano saxophone
Jon Raskin – baritone saxophone, alto saxophone

References 

Hathut Records albums
Rova Saxophone Quartet albums
1986 albums